Freya Ross (née Murray, born 20 September 1983) is a Scottish long-distance runner who competed in the Marathon at the London 2012 Olympics.  She mainly competed in road races, but was also successful on the track competing in 5000 metres and 10,000 metres, as well as cross country running. Ross represented Scotland in the 5,000 metres and 10,000 metres in the 2010 Commonwealth Games. in Delhi in October 2010.  Some of her best road racing results were from 2009 and 2010 when she won the Great Ireland Run in 2010 and the Great Yorkshire Run in both 2009 and 2010 setting the course record in 2009.  In February 2012, Freya won the Scottish Athletics National Cross Country for the sixth time in seven years.

Freya was the second fastest British woman at the 2012 Virgin London Marathon in her first marathon while aiming to qualify for the 2012 Olympics.  She was subsequently awarded a place due to the withdrawal of the injured Paula Radcliffe. She was the first British athlete home in 44th place in a time of 2:32:14.

She has written and self published a recipe book called 'Food on the Run' detailing what her diet is like as a runner.  It is a collection of some of her favourite recipes and gives an insight into the kind of food an athlete eats.  It demonstrates that recipes do not need to be complicated and include obscure ingredients to be nutritious.

Freya lives in Larbert, Scotland with her husband and daughter and works as an Event Coordinator. She previously worked as a structural engineer for Cundall LLP, before a spell as a full-time athlete.

Freya received an Honorary Doctorate from Heriot-Watt University in 2014.

Food on the Run Recipe Book
Food on the Run will give you an insight into the eating habits of an Olympic marathon runner.  The recipes are easy to follow, tasty and nutritious making them relevant for anyone wanting to eat a balanced diet.

Personal bests
1500 metres – 4:15.85 min (2005)
3000 metres – 9:08.97 min (2009)
5000 metres – 15:26.5 min (2010)
10,000 metres – 32:23.44 min (2010)
10k road - 32:28 min (2009) (Sheffield)
Half marathon - 1 hour 11 min 51 seconds (2013) (Glasgow)
Marathon – 2 hours 28 min 12 seconds (2012) (London)

References

External links

Official website

Living people
1983 births
Sportspeople from Edinburgh
Scottish female long-distance runners
British female long-distance runners
Scottish female middle-distance runners
British female middle-distance runners
Scottish female marathon runners
British female marathon runners
Olympic female long-distance runners
Olympic athletes of Great Britain
Athletes (track and field) at the 2012 Summer Olympics
Commonwealth Games competitors for Scotland
Athletes (track and field) at the 2010 Commonwealth Games
British Athletics Championships winners